Colleen Ann Fitzpatrick (born July 20, 1972), better known by her stage name Vitamin C, is an American singer, songwriter, record producer, dancer, and actress. She began her career as an Ivory soap baby and child actress, appearing in John Waters' film Hairspray (1988), and continued to appear in minor roles in films before starting the alternative rock band Eve's Plum in 1991.

In 1999, Fitzpatrick embarked on a solo career under the name Vitamin C, releasing her eponymous debut album Vitamin C (1999), which was certified Platinum by the RIAA. Singles from the record include "Graduation (Friends Forever)" and the Top 20 single "Smile". Her second album, More (2001) spawned the singles "As Long as You're Loving Me" and "The Itch".

She appeared in the horror film Dracula 2000 (2000), and made cameo appearances in Get Over It (2001) and Scary Movie 2 (2001). She also appeared as a panelist on the spoof talent series The WB's Superstar USA in 2004. She was ranked No. 76 on the Maxim Hot 100 Women of 2001.

In March 2012, Fitzpatrick was appointed as Vice President of Music at Nickelodeon. Since early 2019, Fitzpatrick has served as a music executive for Netflix.

Early life
Fitzpatrick was born in Old Bridge, New Jersey, on July 20, 1972. She is the youngest of three children born to Vita, a legal secretary, and Gerard Fitzpatrick, a communications executive. She is of Irish descent. She graduated from Cedar Ridge High School in 1987 (now called Old Bridge High School), where she was a classmate of Junot Díaz. During her high school years she was a dancer who danced professionally in several TV ads, and also starred in her high school musical. She later attended New York University, graduating in 1991 with a Bachelor of Arts degree in English.

Career

Hairspray and Eve's Plum (1988–1998)

In 1988, Fitzpatrick made her screen debut under her real name in the John Waters feature film Hairspray as Amber Von Tussle, the bratty on-screen daughter of co-stars Debbie Harry and Sonny Bono.

She made her first musical outing as the lead singer of the alternative rock band Eve's Plum, named after The Brady Bunch actress Eve Plumb, formed in 1991. She formed the band with Michael Kotch in 1991, whom she met while studying at New York University. A year later the group signed a record deal with Epic Records in 1992, releasing two albums and seven singles between 1993 and 1995.

Vitamin C (1998–2000)
In 1998, Fitzpatrick launched a pop music solo project as "Vitamin C" and signed an album deal with Elektra Records. Released in 1999, her debut solo album Vitamin C peaked on the Billboard 200 at number 29 and was certified Platinum by the RIAA. The album's first single, "Smile", peaked at number 18 on the Billboard Hot 100 and was certified Gold by the RIAA. The second single from the album, "Me, Myself & I", failed to chart. However, the third single "Graduation (Friends Forever)" was more successful, peaking at number 12 on the Top 40 Mainstream Chart and number 38 on the Billboard Hot 100. In Australia, the song peaked at number 2 on the ARIA Charts and was certified Platinum. In the summer of 2000, the song saw a resurgence in popularity in the Republic of Ireland, peaking at number 4 in the country.

Vitamin C was marketed through collaborations with a number of prolific brands. In 2000, Mattel produced a Vitamin C doll which was retailed at approximately $16, and a Vitamin C lipstick shade was made by Tommy Hilfiger. Vitamin C's cover version of the Frankie Valli and the Four Seasons song "December, 1963 (Oh, What a Night)" was used as a brand image theme by the American television network The WB during the 1999–2000 television season. She also wrote and recorded "Vacation", which became the opening theme to the short movie Pikachu's Vacation (from Pokémon: The First Movie). The 2001 video game EA Sports Triple Play featured Vitamin C as an animated baseball player.

In 2000, she played the role of Lucy Westerman in the horror film Dracula 2000 and as herself in the spoof film Da Hip Hop Witch.

More (2000–2001)
In late 2000, Vitamin C released "The Itch", the first single from her second album More. The song peaked on the Billboard Hot 100 at number 45. "The Itch" was a much bigger success in Australia where it charted at number 6 on the ARIA Charts and was certified Platinum. More debuted at number 122 on the Billboard 200. "As Long As You're Loving Me" was released as the second single from the album, but failed to chart in the US and led to Vitamin C being dropped from Elektra Records.

In the February 2001 issue of Cosmopolitan magazine, Vitamin C was voted as one of the "Fun and Fearless Females" of the year. That same year Vitamin C was ranked No. 76 on the Maxim Hot 100 Women of 2001.

"Last Nite" and later activities (2001–2009)
Vitamin C signed with V2 Records in 2001 and released the single "Last Nite" in July 2003. It was a cover version of the hit song by The Strokes and sampled Blondie's "Heart of Glass". The single failed to chart in the US, and peaked at number 70 on the UK Top 75.

In 2005, Vitamin C's cover of "Voices Carry" by 'Til Tuesday was included on the soundtrack for the Disney movie Sky High. The same year, she wrote the song "We Are Gonna Happen" for Emma Roberts on the Unfabulous and More album.

In 2006, she assembled a Radio Disney-aimed group of four teenagers named The Truth Squad. Vitamin C wrote and produced a number of song's for the group's debut album, which included a cover of "Graduation (Friends Forever)". The album was released on April 3, 2007, and made a brief appearance on the Top Kid Audio Chart, where it peaked at No. 23. During this time, Vitamin C was reportedly working on two new albums, a children's world-music album and a pop album, neither of which were released.

In 2006, Fitzpatrick created a production company and worked with various pop singers such as Miley Cyrus. In 2008, she wrote the single "Make Some Noise" for Krystal Meyers. In 2009, she wrote "Let's Get Crazy" for Miley Cyrus as Hannah Montana. Vitamin C also wrote the song "One and the Same", a duet recorded by Demi Lovato and Selena Gomez for the Disney Channel Original Movie Princess Protection Program.

Music executive (2012–present) 
On March 21, 2012, Nickelodeon named Vitamin C as VP of Music. She oversaw all music for Nickelodeon and its sister cable channels.

In 2019, she joined Netflix as an executive in charge of "music creative production, spectacle and events".

Discography 

Studio albums 
Vitamin C (1999)
More (2001)

Filmography

Film

Television

References

Notes

Sources

External links

 [ Vitamin C at All Music]
Vitamin C at Billboard

 
Colleen Fitzpatrick at the Internet Archive

1972 births
Living people
20th-century American actresses
20th-century American singers
20th-century American women singers
21st-century American actresses
21st-century American singers
21st-century American women singers
Actresses from New Jersey
American child actresses
American women pop singers
American women singer-songwriters
American film actresses
American people of Irish descent
American television actresses
American women in electronic music
Electropop musicians
New York University alumni
Old Bridge High School alumni
People from Old Bridge Township, New Jersey
Singer-songwriters from New Jersey